Meridian Radio is the working name of the Woolwich Hospitals Broadcasting Service.  It is a hospital radio station providing entertainment and information to the patients and staff of the  Queen Elizabeth Hospital in Woolwich. It was established from the merger of two radio stations in 1972, becoming the Woolwich Hospitals Broadcasting Service.  The on air name of the station became Meridian Radio in 2001 following the station moving to new studios on Woolwich Common.

The station operates from studios in the Conference Centre at the Queen Elizabeth Hospital, broadcasting 24 hours a day, with live programmes daily.  The station is available online at www.meridianradio.co.uk and on Hospedia Channel 1 at Woolwich's Queen Elizabeth Hospital.

Meridian Radio launched a new logo in June 2010 and in September 2010 launched a brand new on air identity, produced by Bespoke Music.  The new identity launched at 10am on Sunday 26 September.

A New website was launched on 2 October 2011, with added features including an extensive what's on guide for the local area and a shop, where all purchases contribute to Meridian Radio's charity fundraising.

On Saturday 21 July Meridian Radio launched its online webcast to coincide with the arrival of the Olympic Flame in Greenwich.  A special programme with live reports from around the Royal Borough of Greenwich was the first programme broadcast online from 6am.  The station is now aimed at a wider south east London audience.

Meridian Radio is a registered charity and member of the Hospital Broadcasting Association, HBA.

Regular Programmes

Monday
8-10am Breakfast with Derek Scott

6-8pm Trevor Lee

8-10pm Tim Courtnell

10pm-6am Through the Night

Tuesday

8-10am Breakfast with Derek Scott

6-8pm Marina Fennell

8-10pm David Varney

10pm-6am Through the Night

Wednesday

8-10am Breakfast with Derek Scott

6-7pm The Rock 'N' Roll Kids with John E.Davies

7-9pm Duncan Martin

10pm-6am Through the Night

Thursday

8-10am Breakfast with Alan King

6-8pm Trevor Lee

8-10pm Johnny Kaye

10pm-6am Through the Night

Friday

8-10am Bollywood Breakfast with Jyoti

5-6pm Charlton Live

6-8pm   Start your weekend with Alan King

8-10pm  Russell Handy

10pm-6am Through the Night

Saturday

8-10am Saturday Breakfast

10am-12pm The Elwood Show

12-2pm Vivienne Lee

10pm-6am Through the Night

Sunday

8-10am Breakfast

10am-12pm Duncan Martin

12-2pm Paul Beard

4-5pm Owen Proctor-Jackson

5-7pm Craveonmusic with Tina Campbell

10pm-6am Through the Night

Presenters
Alan King

Derek Scott

Duncan Martin

Russell Handy

David Varney

Trevor Lee

Tim Courtnell

Vivienne Lee

Owen Proctor-Jackson

Jyoti

Paul Beard

Marina Fennell

Tina Campbell

John E.Davies

Johnny Kaye

References

External links
 Meridian Radio official website
 HBA official website
 The Rock 'N' Roll kids website

Hospital radio stations
Media and communications in the Royal Borough of Greenwich
Radio stations in London
Radio stations established in 1972